The Paris Concert may refer to:

 The Paris Concert (John Coltrane album), 1963
 The Paris Concert (Oscar Peterson album), 1978
 The Paris Concert: Edition One, a 1980 album by Bill Evans
 The Paris Concert: Edition Two, a 1980 album by Bill Evans